Fairness or being fair can refer to:

 Justice
 The character in the award-nominated musical comedy A Theory of Justice: The Musical. 
 Equity (law), a legal principle allowing for the use of discretion and fairness when applying justice
 Social justice, equality and solidarity in a society
 Distributive justice, the perceived appropriateness of the distribution of goods, benefits, and other outcomes in a society, group, or organization (see also:  teleology)
 Procedural justice, the perceived appropriateness of rules or procedures used to allocate goods, benefits, and other outcomes (see also:  deontology)
 Interactional justice, the perceived appropriateness of interpersonal treatment
 Environmental justice, the perceived appropriateness of the use or treatment of the environment or people via the environment, typically as a function of interpersonal or international relations
 Fairness measure, metrics to quantify the fair distribution of resources
 Perceptions associated with the ventrolateral prefrontal cortex and superior temporal sulcus brain regions, in the case of procedural justice, and the anterior cingulate cortex, anterior insula, and dorsolateral prefrontal cortex, in the case of distributive justice
 Fairness, absence of bias in specific realms:
 In American broadcasting, presentation of controversies in accord with the Fairness Doctrine.
 In computer science, fairness is a property of unbounded nondeterminism.
 In computer science, and specifically in machine learning, fairness is a desirable property of algorithms to avoid bias.
 In network engineering, access to resources formally rated by a fairness measure
 In game theory, abstract principles for achieving fair division 
 In economics, relation among economic factors where price matches fair value that is (not only bias-free but also) rational  
 Fairness of human pigmentation, relatively light coloring, especially of skin
 Beauty, the original meaning of the word
 Being fair, property of motion of a batted baseball that qualifies it as a fair ball 
 Sportsmanship